Chain Gang, is a 1984 3D  prison action thriller film starring Earl Owensby, Robert Bloodworth and Carol Bransford with Leon Rippy. It was based on a true story.

Plot
Framed for murder, Mac McPherson (Owensby) is sentenced to 15 years hard labor in Black Creek Prison Farm.  McPherson breaks loose to prove his innocence and take down the corrupt system that set him up.

References

External links
 

1984 3D films
1984 films
American prison films
American action thriller films
American 3D films
1984 action thriller films
Films directed by Worth Keeter
1980s English-language films
1980s American films